The sixth season of the long-running Australian outback drama McLeod's Daughters began airing on 15 February 2006 and concluded on 29 November 2006 after 32 episodes.

Bridie Carter (Tess), Simmone Jade Mackinnon (Stevie), Rachael Carpani (Jodi), Aaron Jeffery (Alex), Michala Banas (Kate), Brett Tucker (Dave), and Jonny Pasvolsky (Rob/Matt) all returned as main cast members from the previous season. Myles Pollard (Nick) returned for two episodes to wrap up his character's story line. This is the last season to feature Pollard and Carter, as Bridie Carter leaves the series early in the season with Pollard's character. Jonny Pasvolsky leaves the show early in the season, but his character makes a guest appearance in the season finale, and will also return during the seventh season. This is the last season to feature Brett Tucker as his character leaves for Africa in the season finale.

Luke Jacobz returns as a main character playing Dave's brother Patrick. Jacobz has a guest appearance in the fifth season as Patrick. Zoe Naylor returns as a main cast member as Regan McLeod after being a recurring character in the previous season.

Doris Younane has a more recurring role as Moira Doyle. She will become a main cast member in the final two seasons. Dustin Clare joins as the recurring role of Riley Ward, but will act as a main cast member in the following season. Sonia Todd (Meg) returns for several episodes and wraps up her story line with John Jarratt (Terry). Todd will reprise her role in the final two seasons as well, where this is Jarratt's final season on the show. Marshall Napier (Harry) and Inge Hornstra (Sandra) appear for their last season on the series as Napier's character, Harry, dies and Hornstra's character, Sandra, causes his death.

Daniel Feuerriegel (Leo) and Basia A'Hern (Rose) also return from the previous season in recurring roles and a story line together.

Cast

Regular
 Bridie Carter as Tess Silverman McLeod Ryan
 Simmone Jade Mackinnon as Stevie Hall
 Rachael Carpani as Jodi Fountain McLeod
 Aaron Jeffery as Alex Ryan
 Michala Banas as Kate Manfredi
 Brett Tucker as Dave Brewer
 Jonny Pasvolsky as Rob Shelton/Matt Bosnich
 Luke Jacobz as Patrick Brewer
 Zoe Naylor as Regan McLeod

Recurring
 Doris Younane as Moira Doyle
 Myles Pollard as Nick Ryan
 Sonia Todd as Meg Fountain
 Michelle Langstone as Fiona Webb Ryan
 Marshall Napier as Harry Ryan 
 Inge Hornstra as Sandra Ryan
 John Jarratt as Terry Dodge
 Daniel Feuerriegel as Leo Coombes 
 Dustin Clare as Riley Ward
 Peter Hardy as Phil Rakich
 Patrick Frost as Neil Thompson
 Basia A'Hern as Rose Hall-Smith

Guest
 Catherine Wilkin as Liz Ryan
 Henry Nixon as Greg Dawson
 Gillian Alexy as Tayler Geddes

Episodes

Reception

Ratings
On average, the sixth season of McLeod's Daughters was watched by 1.31 million viewers, down 40,000 from the previous season. It was the 2nd most-watched Australian drama of 2006, behind All Saints, and ranked at #5 for its sixth season.

Awards and nominations
The sixth season of McLeod's Daughters received two wins and five nominations at the 2007 Logie Awards. It also received one nomination at the 2006 AFI Awards.

Wins
 Logie Award for Most Popular Actor (Aaron Jeffery)
 Logie Award for Most Popular New Male Talent (Dustin Clare)

Nominations
 AFI Award for Best Television Drama Series
 Gold Logie Award for Most Popular Personality on Australian Television (Simmone Jade Mackinnon)
 Logie Award for Most Popular Actress (Rachael Carpani)
 Logie Award for Most Popular Actress (Simmone Jade Mackinnon)
 Logie Award for Most Popular New Female Talent (Michelle Langstone)
 Logie Award for Most Popular Drama Series

Home media

Notes

References

 www.tv.com

External links
 McLeod's Daughters Official Website

McLeod's Daughters seasons
2006 Australian television seasons